Tung oil or China wood oil is a drying oil obtained by pressing the seed from the nut of the tung tree (Vernicia fordii). Tung oil hardens upon exposure to air (through polymerization), and the resulting coating is transparent and has a deep, almost wet look.  Used mostly for finishing and protecting wood, after numerous coats, the finish can even look plastic-like. Related drying oils include linseed, safflower, poppy, and soybean oils. Raw tung oil tends to dry to a fine, wrinkled finish (the English name for this is gas checking); this property was used to make wrinkle finishes, usually by adding excess cobalt drier. To prevent wrinkling, the oil is heated to gas-proof it (also known as "boiled").

'Tung oil' is often used by paint and varnish manufacturers as a generic name for any wood-finishing product that contains the real tung oil or provides a finish that resembles the finish obtained with tung oil.

History 
The tung oil tree originates in southern China and was cultivated there for tung oil, but the date of cultivation remains unknown. During the Song Dynasty, tung oil was used for waterproofing on ships. The word "tung" is etymologically derived from the Chinese 桐 tóng. The earliest references for Chinese use of tung oil is in the writings of Confucius around 500 to 400 BC.

Composition 
The fatty acids in tung oil and their concentration are listed in the table.

The primary constituent is a fatty acid with a chain of 18 linked carbon atoms or methylene units containing three conjugated double bonds. They are especially sensitive to autoxidation, which encourages cross linking of neighbouring chains, hence hardening of the base resin.

Uses

Wood finishing

Tung oil is very popular today because of two properties: first, it is a naturally derived substance. Second, after it cures (5 to 30 days, weather/temperature related), the result is a very hard and easily repaired finish, so it is used on boat decks and now on floors. The oil is often diluted with hydrocarbon thinner so its viscosity is very low and enables the oil to penetrate the finest grain woods. This thinning vehicle evaporates within 15 to 20 minutes. When applied in many fine/thinner coats over wood, tung oil slowly cures to a matte/light satin look with slight golden tint. Tung oil resists water better than any other pure oil finish and does not darken noticeably with age. It is claimed to be less susceptible to mould than linseed oil. It is considered safe to be used on sculptures made near waterways.

Most polymerized tung oils are sold mixed with mineral spirits to make them easier to work with. Limonene and D-limonene are less toxic alternatives for mineral spirits.

Oil-paper umbrella

The oil-paper umbrella is the traditional umbrella used in China, Japan, and other countries in the sinosphere, and was brought to Western countries through the Silk Road. Tung oil is the "oil" mentioned in the oil-paper umbrella, which is used to protect the paper from getting wet, and to make the umbrella waterproof.

Application 
The traditional technique for applying pure tung oil is to dilute the oil 1:1 with solvent, then apply a succession of very thin films with a soft, lint-free cloth such as tee-shirt cotton. Diluents range from traditional spirits of turpentine to any of the new citrus-based thinners to naphtha. The choice of thinner should be guided by how fast the coating needs to set. Naphtha works well in spray-on applications in well-ventilated studios. Primary coats may be laid down at a 1:1 oil-to-thinner ratio, and successive layers, if not absorbed into the wood, at higher solvent to oil concentrations. This technique brings out the deepest color of the wood while maintaining a matte finish.

Tung oil finishes that start with polymerized oils or tung oil preparations are best applied in the fat over lean principle: thinned pure oil is applied to deeply penetrate the surface, to fill pores. Straight oil is then applied moderately to adhere to the surface and provide a good base for the thick gloss layers. The polymerized oil is then applied thickly as a single layer, allowed to fully dry, buffed smooth with very fine sandpaper and 0000 steel wool. The surface is wiped clean with a moistened rag and allowed to dry. A final coat is applied fairly thickly (the oil will smooth itself into a glass-like coating) and allowed to dry for two to three days. Rags soaked with tung oil can spontaneously combust (burst into flame).

References

Chinese inventions
Painting materials
Vegetable oils
Wood finishing materials